The Apfelküchle is a traditional German pastry, consisting of sliced apples dipped in batter and fried to a golden brown color. It is popular in Baden-Württemberg, a federal state in South-Germany. The Apfelküchle has spread throughout Europe and the US. It is similar to an apple fritter but is made more like a pancake and can be prepared in numerous different fashions. While it is traditionally eaten as a complete meal, because of its sweet taste, it has become popular to eat Apfelküchle as a dessert as well.

Etymology 
A possible translation is little apple pie.

History 
It is not completely certain when Apfelküchle were technically 'invented', however it is known that the pastry was created in south-west Germany, in the state of Baden-Württemberg, where it has been a long-standing traditional meal. Recently, Apfelküchle has spread far beyond Germany's borders and has become very popular.

Season 
Apples do not tend to tolerate long storage through the colder seasons. Apfelküchle are a great use for all of the spare apples that are picked in the summer and early autumn. A large amount of apples that would otherwise be wasted, whether they were not sold, or were slightly damaged before they could be eaten (either en route to the vendor or damaged during harvest), can be used to make Apfelküchle.

Fat Thursday 
Apfelküchle are traditionally eaten in Baden-Württemberg on Fat Thursday, the Thursday prior to Rose Monday (Carnival Monday), similar to eating paczki on fat tuesday. Apfelküchle is traditionally eaten as a main course, however, due to variety and popularity, in recent years, it is often served as a dessert. Especially in the time of carnival, the Apfelküchle is a must. Furthermore, it is part of every church anniversary in southern Germany.

Preparation

Main ingredients 
There are a few different ways in which Apfelküchle is made. Most recipes differ mainly in minor ingredients which are swapped out based on the consumers taste. Apfelküchle all have a main ingredient of apples and dough (made from eggs, flour, sugar, salt, and milk). Different variations of dough can be made by adding extras such as beer, fruit brandy, and cinnamon.

Consumption 

Since the end of the 18th century, it has become common to use a variety of sauces to refine dishes in Baden-Württemberg. As a popular dish in that area, Apfelküchle is often served with its own variety of sauces and sides. The most common way to eat Apfelküchle is warm with cinnamon and sugar, or with powdered sugar dusted on top. One of the most popular refinements of this dish is to serve it cold with a vanilla sauce. Similarly, it is popular, especially among children, to be served with vanilla ice cream. Cooks in Baden-Württemberg also like to flambé it with Grand Marnier or rum and serve it with a little scoop of vanilla ice. Another sauce used to dress Apfelküchle is called Chaudeausauce, a French term for "hot water", which is composed mainly of wine, vinegar, lemon juice, egg yolks and sugar. It is traditionally made with white wine—usually champagne, occasionally with a shot of cognac or sherry. It can be enjoyed both hot and cold.

See also
 List of pastries
 Apple dumplings
 German baked apples

References

External links 
Recipe for Apfelküchle with vanilla sauce

German desserts
Fried foods
Apple dishes